Pavoclinus caeruleopunctatus is a species of clinid native to the Atlantic coast of South Africa where it has been found at a depth of about .

References

External links
 Photograph

caeruleopunctatus
Fish described in 2001